Louisiana (also known as Brooklyn and Salem) is a ghost town in Douglas County, Kansas, United States.

History
Louisiana was founded in 1855, the small town was located along the Santa Fe Trail and hosted a number of amenities for travelers, including an inn, a saloon, a stable, and a store. A post office was established at Louisiana in 1856, and discontinued in 1857. After William Quantrill's Raiders destroyed nearby Lawrence on August 21, 1863. They rode through Louisiana and burned the town to the ground, sparing only the saloon. The town disappeared soon after.

References

Further reading

Geography of Douglas County, Kansas
Ghost towns in Kansas
1855 establishments in Kansas Territory